Life Could Be Verse: Reflections on Love, Loss, and What Really Matters  is an autobiography of Kirk Douglas that he published on his 98th birthday.

The book  contains Douglas' poems, autobiographical stories, and professional and family photographs.

References

American autobiographies